Raj Niwas (Hindi for "Government Residence"), is the common name of the official residences of the Lieutenant Governors of Union territories of India and may refer to:

List of Raj Niwas

See also
Raj Bhavan
Rashtrapati Bhavan
Rashtrapati Nilayam
Rashtrapati Niwas
Vice President's House

External links

Official residences in India